Tetiana Muntian (born 7 March 1968) is a Ukrainian archer. She competed in the women's individual and team events at the 1988 Summer Olympics.

References

External links
 

1968 births
Living people
Soviet female archers
Ukrainian female archers
Olympic archers of the Soviet Union
Archers at the 1988 Summer Olympics
Sportspeople from Chernivtsi